Xingzhongite is an opaque, metallic mineral named for its location of discovery in China.

References

Sulfide minerals
Cubic minerals
Minerals in space group 227